Atabey is an ancestral mother of the Taino, one of two supreme ancestral spirits in the Taíno religion. She was worshipped as a zemi, which is an embodiment of nature and ancestral spirit, (not to be confused with a goddess, how she is commonly referred to in colonial terms to replace Taino verbiage and culture) of fresh water and fertility; she is the female entity who represents the Earth Spirit and the Spirit of all horizontal water, lakes, streams, the sea, and the marine tides. This spirit was one of the most important for the native tribes that inhabited the Caribbean islands of the Antilles, mostly in Puerto Rico (Borikén), Hispaniola, and Cuba.

Atabey or Atabeira defines prime matter and all that is tangible or material and has several manifestations. One is the aforementioned nurturing maternal figure. Another is Caguana: the spirit of love. The last is Guabancex (also known as Gua Ban Ceh): the violent, Wild Mother of storms, volcanoes, and earthquakes.

Alternate names for Atabey are Iermaoakar, Apito, and Sumaiko and Taíno women prayed to Atabey to ensure safe childbirth.

Mythology
Atabey conceived twin sons without intercourse. The best known is Yúcahu because he is the principal Taíno god who rules over the fertility of Yuca (cassava).

In popular culture
During the April 2017 Miss Universe Puerto Rico pageant, Miss Utuado dressed in a costume representing Atabey.

Atabey's symbology (and her avatar Guabancex) is one of the fundamental thematic foundations of the historical thriller Los hijos de la Diosa Huracán, by Daína Chaviano (Grijalbo-Random House, 2019). In this novel, this deity is a key character and subject in developing and solving the mysteries of the plot. 

Atabey, Guabancex with her helpers Guatabá, Cuastriquie, and Juracán (embodiment of the hurricane) are repeatedly evoked in a novel by the Cuban-american writer Frederick A. de Armas. In Sinfonía salvaje (Madrid: Verbum, 2019) the hurricane represents the changes brought about in 1959 by the Cuban Revolution.

References

Taíno mythology
Goddesses of the indigenous peoples of North America
Water goddesses
Fertility goddesses
Creator goddesses
Mother goddesses
Earth goddesses